Fievez is a surname. Notable people with the surname include:

Jean Fievez (1910–1997), Belgian footballer
Jonathan Fievez (born 1978), Australian rower

See also
5365 Fievez, a main-belt asteroid
Fieve